John Broke (by 1511 – 1561 or later) was the member of the Parliament of England for Marlborough for the parliament of November 1554.

He was mayor of Marlborough in 1551–52 and 1560–61.

References 

Members of Parliament for Marlborough
English MPs 1554–1555
Year of birth uncertain
Year of death uncertain
1510s births
1560s deaths
Mayors of Marlborough